The 2022 Asian Women's Junior Handball Championship was 16th edition of the championship held from 7 to 14 March 2022 in Almaty, Kazakhstan under the aegis of Asian Handball Federation. It was the fifth time in history that the championship was organised by the Kazakhstan Handball Federation. It also acted as the qualification tournament for the 2022 Women's Junior World Handball Championship, with top tree teams from the championship directly qualifying for the event to be held in Slovenia.

Previously, the championship was supposed to be held in Uzbekistan, but in December 2021, AHF decided to move the event to Kazakhstan due to unavoidable circumstances. In January 2022, the championship was further postponed from the planned dates of February 13–20 due to the 2022 Kazakh unrest.

Draw
The draw was held on 28 December 2021 in Almaty, Kazakhstan.

Seeding
Teams were seeded according to the AHF COC regulations and rankings of the previous edition of the championship. Teams who did not participated in the previous edition were in Pot 3.

South Korea withdrew from the tournament after the draw.

Results
''All times are local (UTC+6).

References

External links

Asian Handball Championships
Asian Women's Junior Handball Championship
Sports competitions in Almaty
Asian Junior Handball Championship
International handball competitions hosted by Kazakhstan
Women's handball in Kazakhstan
Asian Women's Junior Handball Championship